Terrebonne was an electoral district of the Legislative Assembly of the Parliament of the Province of Canada, in Canada East, immediately north-west of Montreal.  It was created in 1841, based on the previous electoral district of the same name for the Legislative Assembly of Lower Canada. 

Terrebonne was represented by one member in the Legislative Assembly.  It was abolished in 1867, upon the creation of Canada and the province of Quebec.

Boundaries 

Terrebonne electoral district was located to the north-west of Montreal (now included in the city of Terrebonne).

The Union Act, 1840 merged the two provinces of Upper Canada and Lower Canada into the Province of Canada, with a single Parliament.  The separate parliaments of Lower Canada and Upper Canada were abolished.Union Act, 1840, 3 & 4 Vict., c. 35, s. 2.  The Union Act provided that the pre-existing electoral boundaries of Lower Canada and Upper Canada would continue to be used in the new Parliament, unless altered by the Union Act itself.

The Lower Canada electoral district of Terrebonne was not altered by the Act, and therefore continued with the same boundaries in the new Parliament. Those boundaries had been set by a statute of Lower Canada in 1829:

Members of the Legislative Assembly 

Terrebonne was represented by one member in the Legislative Assembly. The following were the members for Terrebonne.

Significant elections 

The first general election in 1841 was marked by considerable threats of violence by opponents of responsible government. The danger of violence was so great that Louis-Hippolyte Lafontaine, an advocate for responsible government and candidate in Terrebonne, was forced to withdraw his candidacy to avoid bloodshed.  Robert Baldwin, one of the leaders of the reform movement in Canada West, proposed that Lafontaine then stand for election in a by-election in York County.  Lafontaine did so and was elected as a member from Canada West. Baldwin's support was one of the starting points for the beginning of the alliance between Baldwin and Lafontaine, which ultimately led to the establishment of responsible government in the Province of Canada in 1848.

Abolition 

The district was abolished on July 1, 1867, when the British North America Act, 1867 came into force, creating Canada and splitting the Province of Canada into Quebec and Ontario.  It was succeeded by electoral districts of the same name in the House of Commons of Canada and the Legislative Assembly of Quebec.

References 

Electoral districts of Canada East